The Afterlight is a 2009 American drama film written and directed by Alexei Kaleina and Craig William Macneill and starring Michael Kelly, Jicky Schnee, Ana Asensio, Rip Torn, Morgan Taddeo and Rhoda Pauley.

Cast
Michael Kelly as Andrew
Jicky Schnee as Claire
Ana Asensio as Maria
Morgan Taddeo as Lucy
Rip Torn as Carl
Rhoda Pauley as Carol

Release
The film premiered at the Rome Film Festival in 2009 and was released at the Quad Cinema on September 10, 2010.

Reception
The film has a 63% percent rating on Rotten Tomatoes based on eight reviews.

Ronnie Scheib of Variety gave the film a positive review and wrote, "Afterlight proceeds without much discernible plot or character development, its objects and places exuding more backstory than its people, though Rip Torn as the father of the sole male protagonist lends a certain woodsy authenticity."

Jeannette Catsoulis of The New York Times also gave the film a positive review and wrote, “ Tempering the film’s oppressive emotions, the cinematographer Zoë White’s exquisite compositions charge leaden rain clouds and rustling branches with eerie life, and dusty indoor corners with shadowy secrets.”

Gary Goldstein of the Los Angeles Times gave the film a negative review and wrote, “ At the same time, it’s hard to embrace this glacially paced, symbolism-heavy film’s elusive — when it’s not being elliptical — story about a city couple’s escape to rural life.”

References

External links
 
 

2009 films
2009 drama films
American drama films
2000s English-language films
2000s American films